United Nations Security Council Resolution 2054 was unanimously adopted on 29 June 2012.

See also 
List of United Nations Security Council Resolutions 2001 to 2100

References

External links
Text of the Resolution at undocs.org

2012 United Nations Security Council resolutions
2012 in Rwanda
June 2012 events
United Nations Security Council resolutions concerning Rwanda